Raiamas longirostris is a species of ray-finned fish in the genus Raiamas. It is a freshwater fish and is only known from the type locality Ubangui at Brazzaville, Central Congo River basin, although the species may be more widespread.

References 

Raiamas
Fish described in 1902